This is an alphabetical list of doom metal bands including stoner metal, sludge metal, drone metal and funeral doom, artists that play within a genre that fuses doom metal with another, such as death-doom and black-doom, and artists that have played doom metal at some point in their career.

A

 Aarni
 Abstrakt Algebra
 Acid Bath
 Acid King
 Acrimony
 Against Nature
 Agalloch
 Ahab
 Alien Boys
 Alkonost
 Amorphis
 Anathema
 Ancestors
 Angel Witch
 Antestor
 Ascending King
 Ashen Mortality
 Ashes You Leave
 Ava Inferi

B

 Benea Reach
 Bilocate
 Black Debbath
 Black Sabbath
 Bloody Panda
 Bongzilla
 Boris
 Brainoil
 Burial Chamber Trio
 Burning Witch
 Buzzov*en

C

 Candlemass
 Catacombs
 Cathedral
 Celtic Frost
 Celestiial
 Church of Misery
 Cirith Ungol
 Confessor
 Corrupted
 Count Raven
 Crowbar
 Cryptal Darkness
 Cult of Luna
 Cultic

D

 Danzig
 Daylight Dies
 Debris Inc.
 Deinonychus
 Dirge
 Disembowelment
 Dolorian
 Doomsword
 Down
 Draconian
 Drottnar

E

 Earth
 Earthride
 Electric Wizard
 Esoteric
 Eternal Elysium
 Evoken

F

 Faith
 Fall of the Idols
 Floor
 Forest Stream
 Funeral

G

 Gallhammer
 The Gates of Slumber
 The Gathering
 Goatlord
 Goatsnake
 Goblin Cock
Ghost
 Grand Magus
 Green Carnation
 Greenmachine
 Grief

H

 High on Fire
 The Hidden Hand
 Hooded Menace
 Hour of 13
 How Like a Winter

I

 Internal Void
 Iron Man
 Iron Monkey
 Isis
 Isole

J

 Jesu
 Jucifer

K

 Katatonia
 Khanate
 Khlyst
 Krux

L

 Lacrimas Profundere
 Lake of Tears
 Longing for Dawn
 Lyijykomppania

M

 Mael Mórdha
 Melvins
 Memento Mori
 Memory Garden
 Mindrot
 Minotauri
 Minsk
 Mirror of Deception
 Monster Magnet
 Monumentum
 Moonspell
 Morgion
 Morphia
 Mortification
 Moss
 Mournful Congregation
 Mouth of the Architect
 My Dying Bride
 My Shameful

N

 Necare
 Neurosis
 Nortt
 Novembers Doom
 Novembre

O

 The Obsessed
 The Ocean Collective
 Officium Triste
 Old Man Gloom
 Om
 Orange Goblin
 Orodruin
 Orphaned Land

P

 Pallbearer
 Pagan Altar
 Pagan Lorn
 Paradise Lost
 Paramaecium
 Pelican
 Penance
 Pentagram
 Place of Skulls
 Planet Gemini
 Pod People
 The Prophecy
 Primitive Man

R

 Ramesses
 Rapture
 Revelation
 Reverend Bizarre
 Rigor Sardonicous
 Runemagick
 Rwake

S

 Sacrilege
 Sahg
 Saint Vitus
 Salem
 Saturnus
 Schaliach
 Seventh Void
 Shape of Despair
 Sheavy
 Silent Stream of Godless Elegy
 Six Feet Deep
 Skepticism
 Sleep
 Solace
 Solitude Aeturnus
 Solstice
 Sons of Otis
 Soulpreacher
 Spirit Caravan
 Spiritus Mortis
 Sunn O)))
 Swallow the Sun
 The Sword
 Spiral Shades

T

 Teeth of Lions Rule the Divine
 The Foreshadowing
 Thergothon
 The 3rd and the Mortal
 This Empty Flow
 Thorr's Hammer
 Thrones
 Thunderstorm
 Torche
 Triptykon
 Tristitia
 Trouble
 Type O Negative

U

 Unearthly Trance
 Unholy
 Unorthodox

V

 Valhall
 Valkyrie
 Veni Domine
 Virgin Black
 Visceral Evisceration

W

 Warhorse
 Warning
 Weedeater
 While Heaven Wept
 Willard
 Winter
 Witch
 Witchcraft
 Witchfinder General
 Woods of Ypres
 Workshed
 Wreck of the Hesperus
 Wretched

Y

 Yob

Z

 Zaraza

References

 
Lists of doom metal bands